Great Sankey High School (GSHS) is a coeducational secondary school and sixth form with academy status, located in Warrington, Cheshire, England. It is a member of the Omega Multi-Academy Trust (OMAT).  The school was first built in the 1970s and extensions have included a mathematics & humanities block and theatre. The school also has a linking leisure centre and arts theatre. GSHS has been awarded, and retained, an Artsmark Gold award, the highest award for the Arts.

GSHS is partnered with South Peninsula High School in Cape Town, South Africa.

In 2010, GSHS was classified as an Outstanding school by Ofsted. The school converted to academy status in January 2013.  In October 2017, the school was reclassified by Ofsted as a Good school.

Extensions 
A new purpose-built sixth-form college was opened on the school site in September 2011 by Alan Yates (former Headteacher) and Simon Moran (Managing Director of SJM Concerts).

In December 2019, the new PE hall was opened by current headteacher John Shannon on the site of what used to be the neighbouring primary school, Barrow Hall Primary School, along with a diner in use for the Year 7s that was completed in January 2019. The new science block containing 11 laboratories that was built on the same construction site was opened in February 2020.   The plans for taking the school’s grounds were confirmed by previous headteacher, Paula Crawley, when Barrow Hall Primary School relocated to a close area.

Uniform 
The uniform is a white shirt, black trousers or green checkered skirt, black blazer with school badge attached and correct tie, differing per year group. The compulsory P.E kit is a black polo shirt for all, a black and white rugby shirt for boys, and either black shorts or black tracksuit bottoms, and optional socks.

Specialisms
In 2004, the school was awarded specialist schools status in the field of Engineering and has since increased the provision of Engineering throughout the curriculum. The school also operates a Young Apprentice scheme, where Year 10 students have the opportunity to Start a two-year course and earn an NVQ level 2 with the school.

In a partnership with the RAC, the school has built an RAC automotive engineering skills centre. This allows students studying engineering and automotive engineering, access to Facilities that few other engineering colleges possess, whilst also providing facilities for other schools and businesses in the local community.

The school has a VEX robotics team called BHCVEX as part of the Engineering department. The team first initiated in 2010 when the team also won their first trophy in a regional competition using the Standard VEX Protobot and Tumbler kit. In 2012 the team participated in the VEX robotics UK national competition and won the competition, qualifying them for the world finals in California, However due to insufficient funds the team could not attend. Sack attack is the 2012-2013 season game, different from the 2011-2012 Gateway game. BHCVEX were finalists in the North West regional in the 2012-2013 season, which qualified them for the 2013 UK national competition where they won the tournament in alliance with two other teams from East Barnet School qualifying the team for the world championships in Anaheim.

Sport
The school has many teams participating in sports such as football, rugby league, hockey, netball, basketball, cricket, badminton, athletics, and handball.  

On 24 August 2019, Great Sankey High School’s Year 7 Rugby team won the Champion Schools Final against Standish High School at Wembley Stadium. While on the 8th July 2022, Great Sankey High School's Year 10 Rugby team won the Champion Schools Final against Spen Valley High School at Kingston Park

Music
The school has two main bands that perform regularly in the local area and abroad, in locations such as Italy, France, Spain and Germany and have played in the UK in London (Covent Garden) and Warrington train station (where they played for the Duke of Edinburgh). In the past, the Concert Band has achieved a silver medal at international level competing against some of the best school and college bands from all around the world. More recently, the Concert Band has achieved a gold award at the regional series of the National Concert Band Festival (2008), held at GSHS, and were invited to play at the 2009 national finals in Cardiff where they achieved a highly commended bronze award. The Swing Band (run by Mr Bryan) competed in Warwick at the national finals last year after gaining a gold medal at the regional series in 2007.

Both bands performed by formal invitation on the Fantasy Festival Stage at Disneyland Park, Paris, in summer 2008, 2012 and 2014. GSHS also has a choir (Sankey Singers [run by Mrs Meredith]). Sankey Singers have performed for the past two years in the regional rounds of the National Festival of Music for Youth, in 2012, they performed in the second stage of the festival, in Birmingham. They also joined the Swing Band for their 2014 performance in Disneyland. The music department also hold an open music event, The Great 'S' Factor, each year and several smaller casual bands, performing a wide variety of music.

House system
The school implemented a house system in the academic year beginning September 2007 to ease the strain on the heads of years, who previously had been allocated one year of students and had to manage all these students throughout their 5 year attendance at Great Sankey High School. It was decided that each house would have two forms from each year, and there would be twelve forms for each year group. Each head of house would then only have to manage 10 forms instead of 12, and each would only have to manage two year 11 forms at one time, instead of a head of year looking after all year 11 forms. Learners gain House Points for attending extra-curricular activities and going above and beyond the call of duty in lessons.

Members of each house can be identified by their ties, featuring their house colours. The new ties, which were designed by learners, are being implemented from September 2009. Students are issued with house coloured planners and attend "House Assemblies". Sports day and other interhouse competitions are regularly organised each term, and at the end of the year, the top achievers from each house win a trip to Blackpool Pleasure Beach.

Each year, two year eleven students are chosen as House Captains and help in the running and organization of their house. Introduced in September 2014, two year ten students get the opportunity to become Deputy House Captains.

In December 2019, the school announced that its House Office Team by bringing in one Head for Newton House, six new deputy heads for all houses and three new house officers for Austen, Parks and Thompson Houses. This took place after the holidays, in January 2020, moving the team into temporary places for each house until a bigger area for the House Office Team is accommodated. 

The school has six houses, each with their own colours, named after people who have been influential and excelled at what they have done:

 (Jane) AUSTEN, Light blue (won: 2)
 (Roger) BANNISTER, Dark blue (won: 1)
 (Sir Isaac) NEWTON, Red (won: 2)
 (Rosa) PARKS, Purple (won: 3)
 (George) STEPHENSON, Yellow (won: 3)
 (Baroness Tanni) Grey-THOMPSON, Orange (won: 1)

The houses also partner up based on alphabetical order. Austen and a Bannister are partner houses, along with Newton and Parks, and Stephenson and Thompson Houses.

In May 2021, the house system was largely scrapped and was replaced by the year system. However, it still exists for competition purposes.

Year system
The school implemented a year system in May 2021. 4 of the previous 6 head of houses became head of Year 7, 8, 9 and 10. At the time Year 11 had already left after finishing their exams. The other 2 head of years became head of KS3 and KS4. In September 2021, the new head of the new Year 7's was chosen. The House Captains continued as previously.

Each year group has their own colour which are represented on their ties:

 Year 7, Red 
 Year 8, Dark blue
 Year 9, Purple
 Year 10, Yellow
 Year 11, Orange

Year 7 and 8 share a year office, Year 9 have their own year office and Year 10 and 11 share a year office.

Form groups are now identified with the following YearGroup/House1or2 (e.g. 7/B1, 7/B2)

Notable former pupils
 Shafilea Ahmed – murder victim
Kathleen Dawson – backstroke swimmer and gold medal-winner at 2020 Tokyo Olympics
Adam Davies - Welsh international goalkeeper currently at Stoke City
Ben Evans – rugby league player for London Broncos, Warrington Wolves, Bradford Bulls, Toulouse Olympique and Wales
Rhys Evans – rugby league player for Warrington Wolves and Leigh Centurions
Andrew Gower – actor
Gareth O'Brien – rugby league player for Warrington Wolves and Salford Red Devils
Gemma Prescott – Paralympic athlete in F32 throwing events

References

External links

Great Sankey High School DFES information and data

Secondary schools in Warrington
Academies in Warrington
Specialist engineering colleges in England